Kaatttile Thadi Thevarude Ana is a 1995 Indian Malayalam-language film, directed by K. K. Haridas, starring Jagathy Sreekumar and Siddique in the lead roles. Basic premise is loosely based on the 1993 American political comedy film Dave.

Plot
Venugopal is a sincere home minister who has a sister, Sindhu. Sindhu is in love with Devan. An incident happens that questions the minister integrity. In a newspaper, a legislator announces that he will show all the ganja dealers in a forest if both of them go together. The minister accepts the challenge and goes with the MLA. In the forest, the MLA and minister's Personal  Assistant, Alex set a trap, the minister gets shot and falls down in the forest and now a duplicate of the home minister, who was a usual local nuisance (Manikantan), is now set as home minister. Manikantan now has to obey the PA and act according to the PA's wishes. Meanwhile, the original home minister is now recovering from the injuries he sustained in the forest and tells the tribal folk that he himself is the home minister. Finally, the friends of the fake minister also find Venugopal. They admit him to a nearby mental asylum. The fake minister overhears a terrorist speak with the PA to kill Manikantan later after ISRO data gets leaked and they get the money from ea foreign power. Devan, who was in prison (framed by Alex), enters the scene. Devan goes along with the fake home minister to the asylum and frees the original minister. At the end, the villains arrive and fight. Eventually, the police arrive and Venugopal orders the police to arrest the PA and all the villains.

Cast

References

External links

1995 films
1990s Malayalam-language films